Breakthrough Collaborative (formerly Summerbridge National) is the umbrella organization of a collaborative of programs across the United States and in Hong Kong that aim to effect positive change in urban schools.  Breakthrough offers high-potential, under-served middle school students the opportunity to participate in rigorous academic enrichment programs throughout the summer and school year. Students make a commitment to participate in the program through middle school and high school and in turn, Breakthrough provides many services to students and their families, ranging from academic enrichment to one-on-one tutoring to high school and college preparation.  Additionally, all Breakthrough classes are taught by talented, high-achieving high school and college students from around the country who are interested in the field of education. Through the teacher development program offered by Breakthrough, these young educators become potential candidates for professional teaching and educational leadership positions after college. Teaching at Breakthrough has been named a Top Ten Internship in America by the Princeton Review, as well as other prestigious national organizations, and a 1999 Stanford University report stated that "72% [of Breakthrough teachers] went on to work in other educationally related careers or internships after teaching at a Breakthrough site."

Breakthrough was founded in 1978 by Lois Loofbourrow at San Francisco University High School. Since then, numerous sites have opened, all in various sized urban areas.  The sites are joined together under the umbrella organization, Breakthrough Collaborative, based in San Francisco.  Sites function either through public-private partnerships with an independent educational institution or maintain their own 501(c)3 status.

Since its inception in 1978, Breakthrough programs around the world have generated thousands of student and teacher alums.  In 2003, the Summerbridge/Breakthrough Alumni Network or SBAN was formed through the efforts of alumni.  SBAN is based out of Atlanta, but holds annual conferences around the United States.

In March 2006, the 22 host schools of Breakthrough programs were awarded the Klingenstein Leadership Award by the Klingenstein Center at Teachers College, Columbia University.  Breaking from the tradition of giving this prestigious award to an individual, 26 independent schools received the 2006 award.  Past recipients include William Durden, Diane Ravitch, Robert Coles, and Howard Gardner.  In 2007, the Johns Hopkins University Center for Summer Learning awarded Breakthrough Collaborative and its affiliate site in Pittsburgh, with the Excellence in Summer Learning Award for exemplary mission, performance, and infrastructure in out-of-school academic support.

Breakthrough at Hong Kong is called Summerbridge Hong Kong. Summerbridge Hong Kong is the only site outside of the United States. A key difference is that at Summerbridge Hong Kong, teachers teach self-designed topics with support from the Dean of Faculty. A typical day for a Summerbridge Hong Kong student consists of morning all-school meeting (ASM), classes in the morning, lunch with teachers, and extracurricular time.

List of Breakthrough programs 
Breakthrough programs are offered in the following locations:

 Breakthrough Atlanta, Atlanta, GA (at The Lovett School)
 Breakthrough Central Texas, Austin, TX (Austin ISD students at University of Texas at Austin and at St Andrews Episcopal School, Manor Independent School District students at a Manor ISD campus)
 Breakthrough Birmingham, Birmingham, AL (at Hayes K-8 School)
 Breakthrough Greater Boston, Cambridge, MA and Boston, MA (at Cambridge Rindge and Latin School)
 Breakthrough Cincinnati, Cincinnati, OH (at Cincinnati Country Day School)
 Breakthrough Kent Denver, Denver, CO (at Kent Denver School)
 Breakthrough Fort Worth, Fort Worth, TX (at Fort Worth Country Day School)
 Summerbridge Hong Kong, Wan Chai, Hong Kong
 Breakthrough Houston, Houston, TX (at Episcopal High School and St. John's School)
 Breakthrough Manchester, Manchester, NH (at The Derryfield School)
 Breakthrough Miami, Miami, FL (at Ransom Everglades School, Carrollton School of the Sacred Heart, Miami Country Day School, The Cushman School, and Palmer Trinity School)
 LearningWorks at Blake, Minneapolis, MN (at The Blake School)
 Breakthrough New Orleans, New Orleans, LA (at Isidore Newman School)
 Breakthrough New York, Manhattan, NY and Brooklyn, NY (at The Town School and Bishop Loughlin Memorial High School)
 Breakthrough Norfolk, Norfolk, VA (at Norfolk Academy)
 Breakthrough of Greater Philadelphia, Philadelphia, PA (at Germantown Friends School and St. Joseph's University)
 Summerbridge Pittsburgh, Pittsburgh, PA (at Sewickley Academy)
 Breakthrough Providence, Providence, RI (at Wheeler School)
 Breakthrough Sacramento, Sacramento, CA (at Sacramento Country Day School)
 Breakthrough Twin Cities, Minneapolis, MN and St. Paul, MN (at Mounds Park Academy and St. Paul Central)
 Breakthrough San Francisco, San Francisco, CA (at San Francisco Day School)
 Summerbridge San Francisco, San Francisco, CA (at San Francisco University High School)
 Breakthrough San Juan Capistrano, San Juan Capistrano, CA (at St. Margaret's Episcopal School)
 Breakthrough Santa Fe, Santa Fe, NM (at Santa Fe Preparatory School)
 Breakthrough Silicon Valley, San Jose, CA (at Herbert Hoover Middle School)

References

External links 

Personal development
Student financial aid
Gifted education
Student financial aid in the United States